Proplerodia piriana is a species of beetle in the family Cerambycidae. It was described by Martins and Galileo in 2009. It is known to be from Bolivia and Brazil.

References

Onciderini
Beetles described in 2009